Clerks is a 1994 American black-and-white comedy film written and directed by Kevin Smith (in his feature directorial debut), produced and edited by Kevin Smith and Scott Mosier, and starring Brian O'Halloran, Jeff Anderson, Marilyn Ghigliotti, Lisa Spoonhauer, Jason Mewes, Smith, and Mosier. It presents a day in the lives of store clerks Dante Hicks (O'Halloran) and Randal Graves (Anderson) as well as their acquaintances. It is the first of Smith's View Askewniverse films, and introduces several recurring characters, notably Jay and Silent Bob (Mewes and Smith respectively).

Clerks was shot for $27,575 in the convenience and video stores where director Smith worked in real life. Upon its theatrical release, it received generally positive reviews and grossed over $4 million in theaters, launching Smith's career. In 2006, a sequel was released. Additionally, a third installment was released in 2022.

It is often regarded as a cult classic and a landmark in independent filmmaking. In 2019, the film was selected for preservation in the United States National Film Registry by the Library of Congress as being "culturally, historically, or aesthetically significant".

Plot 
Dante Hicks is a young man who works as a retail clerk at Quick Stop Groceries in Leonardo, New Jersey. On his day-off, he is called into work to cover another employee's morning shift. Arriving at the store, he finds that the locks to the security shutters are jammed closed with gum, so he hangs a sheet over them with "I ASSURE YOU; WE'RE OPEN!" written in shoe polish. Soon after opening, Dante's best friend, wisecracking slacker Randal Graves, arrives for his own workday at the next door video rental store, RST Video.

The two prepare for another ordinary day immersed in their tedious customer service jobs. Dante repeatedly laments that he is "not even supposed to be here today," while Randal neglects his job at the video store to keep Dante company at the Quick Stop. They pass the time engaging in philosophical discussions on a wide variety of topics, including movies, sex, relationships, and difficult customers. Some of the customers they encounter during the day are angry and demanding, others clueless and impolite, still others prove unexpectedly wise. After several hours, Dante discovers that his boss, who was supposed to arrive at 12 to relieve Dante, went on a trip to Vermont, leaving him to run the store for the rest of the day. Dante and Randal find a number of reasons to leave the store and slack off, from a rooftop hockey game with their friends to crashing an ill-fated wake for Julie Dwyer, one of Dante's ex-lovers.

Throughout the film, Dante is torn between Veronica Loughran, his current girlfriend, and Caitlin Bree, his ex-girlfriend with whom he still secretly communicates despite her being engaged. Dante is distressed when he learns Veronica has given oral sex to 36 other men before him, and engaged in snowballing with at least one. Despite Veronica's doting on him, Dante chooses to rekindle his relationship with Caitlin. However, Caitlin is traumatized by an incident in the Quick Stop bathroom; in the dark, she had sex with a person that she thought was Dante, but who was actually an old customer who had died of a heart attack while masturbating to a pornographic magazine Dante provided him earlier. Caitlin leaves catatonic in an ambulance.

Jay and Silent Bob, a pair of drug dealers who spend their time loitering outside the store, invite Dante to party with them after hours, but Dante declines, considering the various seedy characters the two usually attract. Aware of Dante's problems, Silent Bob tersely convinces him that he really loves Veronica, but Randal has already confessed the previous events to her, prompting a furious Veronica to dramatically dump Dante. Dante then finally loses his temper and fights Randal, trashing the Quick Stop.

Dante and Randal have a crucial moment of clarity after their fight. Dante repeats his refrain that he's "not even supposed to be here today" and an enraged Randal, fed up with Dante's self-pitying and whining about how rotten his life is, explodes at Dante, explaining that he (Dante, not Randal) closed the store several times to slack off. He then says that Dante came to work on his own free will and therefore could have left at any time, preventing the day's events. Furthermore, he says they are not as "advanced" over the customers as they think they are, or else they would not be stuck in such lowly jobs, leaving Dante speechless.

After the two make amends and clean the store, Dante plans to take the day-off the next day in order to visit Caitlin in the hospital, try to reconcile with Veronica, and possibly get some direction in his life. Randal leaves, but not before tossing Dante's shoe-polish sign in his face and declaring, "You're closed!"

Cast

Production

Development 
When writing the script, writer and director Kevin Smith based the character of Dante Hicks on himself, Randal Graves on his friend Bryan Johnson who appeared in Smith's subsequent films as Steve-Dave Pulski, and Jay on Jason Mewes, who ended up playing him in the movie.

Casting 

Many of Smith's family and friends played roles due to budget constraints. One of them, Walt Flanagan, who, in addition of creating the character of Silent Bob's Russian metal-head cousin Olaf, plays four roles in this film: The "Woolen Cap Smoker" in the beginning, the famous "Egg Man" (both in which he reprises in Clerks III), the "Offended Customer" during the "jizz mopper" scene, and the "Cat Admiring Bitter Customer", as well as the final RST Video customer in a deleted scene. Smith never intended for Flanagan to play this many roles, but had to as the actors he got to play them just did not show up, and would often, in jest, refer to Flanagan as "the Lon Chaney of the '90s". Flanagan would also appear in Smith's subsequent films as Walt "The Fanboy" Grover opposite Johnson's Steve-Dave.

Brian O'Halloran, a local stage actor who would play Dante in the film, discovered the movie through an audition notice that Smith gave to the theater. When auditioning, O'Halloran didn't know what type of role he was getting, and did not understand the gist of what he was auditioning for.

Smith originally wrote the part of Randal for himself, dryly admitting in the DVD audio commentary to be the reason he gave Randal his most-liked lines. However, Smith found that writing, directing, working at the store, and playing one of the lead roles all at the same time was too hard and he kept forgetting his lines in the process, so he gave the role of Randal to another one of his friends, Jeff Anderson, while Smith took on the less-demanding role of Silent Bob.

Filming 
Clerks was shot on black-and-white 16mm film stock and roughly edited due to a budget of $27,575. To acquire the funds for the film, Kevin Smith sold a large portion of his extensive comic book collection in 1993, most of which he has since bought back, borrowed $3,000 from his parents, maxed out eight to ten credit cards with $2,000 limits, dipped into a portion of funds he got back from his college education, and spent insurance money awarded for a car he and Mewes lost in a flood. The film was shot in 21 days (with two "pick-up" days).

The Quick Stop convenience store (located at 58 Leonard Avenue in Leonardo, New Jersey), where Smith worked, was the primary setting for the film. He was only allowed to film in the store at night while it was closed (from 10:30 pm to 5:30 am), hence the plot point of the shutters being closed due to a vandal having jammed gum in the padlocks. Because Smith was working at Quick Stop during the day and shooting the film at night, he frequently slept no more than an hour a day. By the end of the 21-day shoot, Smith was unable to stay awake while Dante and Randal's fight was shot.

Jason Mewes is not shown in any of the posters nor photoshoots for Clerks. This is because Miramax, who bought distribution rights for the film, believed that he looked too threatening as Jay, thus not wanting to lose the appeal for potential moviegoers.

The MPAA originally gave the film an NC-17 rating, based purely on the film's explicit dialogue, as it contains no real violence aside from Dante and Randal's fight near the end, no sex, and no clearly depicted nudity. This would have serious financial implications for the film, as very few cinemas in the United States screen NC-17 films. Miramax hired civil liberties lawyer Alan Dershowitz to appeal the decision and the MPAA relented and re-rated the film with the more commercially viable "R" rating, without any alterations.

Lost scene 
The events of Julie Dwyer's wake were written by Smith but were not filmed due to the prohibitive cost of producing the scene. In 2004, the scene was produced in colored animation using the same style of Clerks: The Animated Series, featured O'Halloran and Anderson reprising their roles and Joey Lauren Adams in a cameo as her character Alyssa Jones, who'd later appear in further View Askewniverse films, for the tenth anniversary DVD release. The "lost scene" was also presented in comic-book form of the Clerks comic book series, with the title of "The Lost Scene".

Original ending 
The original ending for the film was meant to continue from when Randal throws the "I Assure You We're Open" sign to Dante. After Randal leaves, Dante proceeds to count out the register and does not notice another person entering the store. Dante at first thinks it's Randal but looks up and informs the person that the store is no longer open. The man then pulls out a gun and shoots Dante, killing him. Afterward, the man puts all the money from the cash register in a bag and walks out of the store. The sequence ends with Dante's dead face looking off past the camera; after the credits roll – the soundtrack over it being a cash register making noises – a customer (played by Smith with his beard shaved off) wearing glasses and in a ponytail and a baseball jersey comes into the store, sees no one around,  (as Dante is lying dead behind the counter) steals a pack of cigarettes, and runs off.

The depressing ending was criticized by Bob Hawk and John Pierson after its first screening at the Independent Feature Film Market, and under Pierson's advice, Smith cut the ending short, ending with Randal's departure and deleting Dante's death. Fans have since analyzed the death of Dante as an homage to the ending of The Empire Strikes Back (1980), which is discussed earlier in the film as Dante's favorite Star Wars movie because "it ended on such a down note". The film's extended cut also implied that, because Randal disconnected the security camera earlier in the day during the roof hockey scene, the killer would never be caught.

Smith has since claimed he concluded Clerks this way for three reasons. The primary reason was irony, the ending would be the payoff for Dante's repeated claims of "I'm not even supposed to be here today!" Smith also stated that the ending was an homage to the ending of Spike Lee's Do The Right Thing (1989), a comedic film with a dark ending. Lee's name can also be seen in the "special thanks" portion of the credits. Smith also stated that he ended Clerks with Dante's death because he "didn't know how to end a film". Both versions are available in Clerks X, the 10th-anniversary special edition; the lost ending itself was among the extras on the 1995 LaserDisc and the 1999 DVD release; Smith states in the audio commentary on the 1999 DVD that had he kept the original ending, likely no further View Askewniverse films would have been made. The culprit in question was played by Smith's cousin John Willyung, who went on to appear in Smith's later films (most notably as Cohee Lunden in Chasing Amy and Clerks III and as himself in Jay and Silent Bob Reboot). On their movie review show, Gene Siskel and Roger Ebert (both of whom had given thumbs-up reviews to the film in 1994), had a special segment on a November 1995 episode that presented and discussed this original ending. Siskel said that having the alternate ending could have worked but it would have to be longer with more tension to suggest that something like this could happen, while Ebert said he understood Smith's desire to do something memorable/shocking to end the film but concluded "ultimately, I'm glad Smith decided to spare Dante."

Release
Clerks became a surprising success after it was taken by Miramax Films and grossed over $3 million in the United States, despite never playing on more than 50 theater screens in the United States at the same time. It grossed $1.3 million internationally for a worldwide gross of $4.4 million.

Reception 
Clerks was well received by critics and developed a cult following. On Rotten Tomatoes, it currently has an approval rating of 90% based on 60 reviews, with an average rating of 7.50/10. The website's critical consensus reads, "With its quirky characters and clever, quotable dialogue, Clerks is the ultimate clarion call for slackers everywhere to unite, and, uh, do something, we guess?" On Metacritic the film has a weighted average score of 70 out of 100, based on 17 critics, indicating "generally favorable reviews". 

Roger Ebert gave the film three stars out of a possible four, praising it for interestingly depicting a full day of "utterly authentic" middle-class life, adding: "Within the limitations of his bare-bones production, Smith shows great invention, a natural feel for human comedy, and a knack for writing weird, sometimes brilliant, dialogue." Peter Travers gave the film four out of four stars, calling attention to Anderson's "deadpan comic brilliance" and writing that "Smith nails the obsessive verbal wrangling of smart, stalled twentysomethings who can't figure out how to get their ideas into motion."

Year-end lists 
 8th – Yardena Arar, Los Angeles Daily News
 10th – Todd Anthony, Miami New Times
 11th – Peter Travers, Rolling Stone
 Top 10 (listed alphabetically, not ranked) – Bob Ross, The Tampa Tribune
 Top 10 (listed alphabetically, not ranked) – Jeff Simon, The Buffalo News
 Top 10 (not ranked) – Betsy Pickle, Knoxville News-Sentinel
 Top 10 runners-up (not ranked) – Janet Maslin, The New York Times
 Honorable mention – Dan Webster, The Spokesman-Review
 Honorable mention – Michael MacCambridge, Austin American-Statesman

Legacy 
When released, the film was noted for its realism and memorable characters. Clerks won the "Award of the Youth" and the "Mercedes-Benz Award" at the 1994 Cannes Film Festival, tied with Fresh for the "Filmmakers Trophy" at the Sundance Film Festival and was nominated for three Independent Spirit Awards (Best First Feature, Best First Screenplay and Jeff Anderson for Best Debut Performance). In 2000, readers of Total Film magazine voted Clerks the 16th-greatest comedy film of all time and in 2006, British film magazine Empire listed Clerks as the 4th greatest independent film. The film is also No. 33 on Bravo's 100 Funniest Movies. In 2008, Entertainment Weekly ranked it 13th on "The Cult 25: The Essential Left-Field Movie Hits Since '83" and 21st on "The Comedy 25: The Funniest Movies of the Past 25 Years". Also in 2008, Empire named it one of their "500 Greatest Movies of All-Time", placing it 361st on the list. The film was also one of the 500 films nominated for a spot on AFI's 100 Years…100 Laughs but failed to make the top 100. The film was also included in the book 1001 Movies You Must See Before You Die.

In 2019, Clerks was among 25 films chosen to be added to the Library of Congress' National Film Registry.

Home media 
Clerks was first released on VHS on May 23, 1995. This was followed by a LaserDisc version on August 30, 1995, and a DVD on June 29, 1999. The laserdisc and DVD versions feature the original letterboxed version of the film, audio commentary by Smith and various cast and crew members, seven deleted scenes from the film, a theatrical trailer, and a music video for Soul Asylum's "Can't Even Tell" directed by Smith which features him, Mewes, Anderson, and O'Halloran reprising their roles from the film.

On September 7, 2004, Clerks X was released to celebrate the film's tenth anniversary. This three-disc set includes, among other things, the features from the initial 1999 DVD, the aforementioned Lost Scene, an unrestored First Cut featuring the deleted scenes and original ending intact, the original cast auditions, a new making-of documentary entitled The Snowball Effect, a The Tonight Show short film starring Dante and Randal entitled The Flying Car, Smith and Mosier's student film Mae Day, MTV spots with Jay and Silent Bob, the original cast auditions, still galleries, and eight articles and reviews. Many of these features feature new video introductions from Smith and Mosier. All these features were carried over to the 15th Anniversary Blu-ray on November 17, 2009, along with a new documentary, Oh, What a Lovely Tea Party, originally made for Smith's 2001 film Jay and Silent Bob Strike Back. Unlike the initial 1999 DVD, Clerks X is no longer in print.

The film was released on UMD (playable on PlayStation Portable) on November 15, 2005. Special features include "Clerks: The Lost Scene", "The Flying Car", and original cast auditions. In the fall of 2006, a new edition of the Clerks DVD appeared in Canada, dubbed the Clerks: Snowball Edition. The new release included a photo of a bikini-clad model on the cover and some of the extra features from the 1999 edition. It appears Smith was not involved in this release, as he indicated on his official message forum in August 2006 that he was not aware of its release.

Outside the US, Clerks was distributed in the UK by Fox Video through Fox Guild Home Entertainment, and in Canada by Alliance Atlantis. Since 2020, DVD and Blu-Ray distribution has been handled by Paramount Home Entertainment following Paramount Global's acquisition of 49% of Miramax.

Soundtrack 

The soundtrack was released on October 11, 1994. It was composed of various new and previously released songs by alternative rock, grunge and punk rock artists such as Bad Religion, Love Among Freaks, Alice in Chains, and Soul Asylum. The soundtrack also featured various sound clips from the film. It has been noted that Clerks is one of the very few films in which the cost of obtaining the rights to the music used was a great portion of the production costs for the entire film.

The Soul Asylum song "Can't Even Tell", which was played over the film's end credits and featured on the soundtrack, peaked at number 16 on the Billboard Hot Modern Rock Tracks chart in 1994. The music video for the song was directed by Smith and was filmed in the same locations as the film. The video featured Smith, Jason Mewes, Jeff Anderson and Brian O'Halloran reprising their roles from Clerks.

Another song which appeared on the soundtrack was "Got Me Wrong" by Alice in Chains, which had previously been released on the band's extended play Sap (1992). The song was issued as a single in late 1994, due to renewed radio interest from the song's appearance in Clerks. The song peaked at #7 on the Billboard Hot Mainstream Rock Tracks and #22 on the Billboard Modern Rock Tracks in early 1995.

Sequels 
Although not direct sequels in terms of addressing the original film's storyline, characters from the original Clerks – primarily Jay and Silent Bob – appeared in the films Mallrats (1995), Chasing Amy (1997), Dogma (1999), Jay and Silent Bob Strike Back (2001), and Jay and Silent Bob Reboot (2019), all of which take place in the same continuity as Clerks. Dante and Randal also reprised their roles in Jay and Silent Bob Strike Back, which was originally promoted as the finale to the series, but an official sequel to Clerks was announced a few years later.

Clerks II 

The live-action, feature film sequel to Clerks was released on July 21, 2006. The working title was The Passion of the Clerks, though the film was released under the title Clerks II. The credits for Dogma stated "Jay and Silent Bob will return in Clerks 2: Hardly Clerkin "; however, that project "evolved" into Jay and Silent Bob Strike Back. The sequel features Jeff Anderson and Brian O'Halloran reprising their roles as Dante Hicks and Randal Graves. The two now work at a Mooby's restaurant after the latter's incompetence resulted in the destruction of the Quick Stop and RST Video.

Clerks III 

During interviews for Clerks II, Smith briefly discussed the possibility of a Clerks III. Stating that "if there's ever gonna be a Clerks III, it would be somewhere down the road in my 40s or 50s, when it might be interesting to check back in on Dante and Randal. But I don't know about Jay and Bob so much, 'cause at 45, leaning on a wall in front of a convenience store might be a little sad." Smith repeated this sentiment on one of the audio commentary tracks on the Clerks II DVD, to which Anderson jokingly replied, "Oh, don't get me started", referring to Anderson's well known doubts about making Clerks II when first approached by Smith.

On March 29, 2012, Smith expressed his interest in producing Clerks III as a Broadway play after seeing the Theresa Rebeck comedy Seminar starring Alan Rickman, with whom Smith had previously worked on Dogma.

On December 10, 2012, Smith released a special Hollywood Babble-On episode, Hollywood Babble-On #000: GIANT SIZED ANNUAL # 1: CLERKS III, AUDIENCE 0, in which he revealed greater details on his plans for Clerks III. Smith stated that an ongoing audit over residuals from Clerks II with The Weinstein Company was causing a delay in several key Clerks III cast and crew members, including Anderson and Mosier, from coming on board until the audit was resolved. Smith also revealed that he would like to crowdsource Clerks III, either through Kickstarter or Indiegogo, with contributors receiving anything from DVDs, posters, and even roles as extras in the film. On June 5, 2013, he changed his mind on crowdsourcing, stating "I've got access to money. And worst-case scenario, I can put up my house."

Smith worked on a script for Clerks III from March to May 2013, stating when he completed it that it was "The Empire Strikes Back" of the series. In July 2013, Mewes stated that they were now just waiting to hear back from The Weinstein Company about funding.

On September 26, 2014, Smith stated on his Hollywood Babble-On podcast, that he was glad that he made Tusk, stating, "Everything in my life would suck right now if I hadn't made that movie. I'm back in movies now. I've got three lined up, and this is the fucking grand news. Tusk was the absolute bridge to Clerks III. Because of Tusk, I got my financing for Clerks III". Smith continued: "A year and change ago, I was trying to fucking desperately get Clerks III made for the 20th anniversary. And that desperation, I must have reeked of it, because I couldn't fucking find money and shit. But it was Tusk, it was people going 'Holy fuck! What else do you have?' And I was like, Clerks III, done. So everybody that's like, 'He failed, he failed', thank you – I failed into Clerks III. So, never trust anybody when they tell you how your story goes, man. You know your story. You write your own story.”

There were plans to start shooting Clerks III in May 2015, but these were put on hold to film another sequel, Mallrats 2. However, by June 2016 the plans for a Mallrats sequel had been turned into plans for a Mallrats TV series.

In July 2019, Smith announced that he would do a live reading of Clerks III at the First Avenue Playhouse in Atlantic Highlands, New Jersey. The reading was held on August 3, 2019. That same month, Smith revealed at San Diego Comic Con that he was writing a new script for Clerks III and promises to make the film.

On October 1, 2019, Smith confirmed on Instagram that Clerks III was happening and that Jeff Anderson agreed to reprise his role as Randal. "It'll be a movie that concludes a saga. It'll be a movie about how you're never too old to completely change your life. It’ll be a movie about how a decades-spanning friendship finally confronts the future. It'll be a movie that brings us back to the beginning—a return to the cradle of civilization in the great state of #newjersey. It’ll be a movie that stars Jeff and @briancohalloran, with me and Jay in supporting roles. And it'll be a movie called CLERKS III!" The new script will follow Randal, after surviving a heart attack, and Dante making a movie about their lives at the store, a plot initially conceived as a film adaptation of Clerks: The Animated Series titled Clerks: Sell Out.

Principal photography began on August 2, 2021, in Red Bank, New Jersey. Filming wrapped on August 31, 2021.

Clerks III had its world premiere on September 4, 2022, at the Count Basie Center for the Arts in Red Bank, New Jersey and was released on September 13, 2022, by Lionsgate and Fathom Events.

Related projects 
Following Clerks, Smith set several more films in the same "world", which he calls the View Askewniverse of overlapping characters and stories. Of all of Smith's films, however, Clerks is the one with the most direct spin-off products.

Clerks: The TV Show 
A pilot for a live-action TV series was produced in 1995. It was produced by Touchstone Television and was to be developed by Richard Day. The pilot only referenced the character names and starred none of the cast from the original film, contained no foul language (except words suitable enough for a TV-PG rating), and did not feature Silent Bob. The character of Jay was featured, prompting Smith to point out that he owned the character rights to both Jay and Silent Bob (for the purposes of featuring them in separate films). The producers' solution was to change the character's name to Ray. Smith was unaware of the production of the series until casting was underway. Smith, as well as Mosier and Mewes, had been in production with Mallrats at the time and attempted to become involved in the series but became disheartened quickly as an episode he had written for the series was shot down to be used as a potential B-plot. He would later use the script for an episode of Clerks: The Animated Series.

O'Halloran and Anderson both auditioned to reprise their roles of Dante and Randal from the film but were replaced by Andrew Lowery and future SNL performer Jim Breuer. After seeing the result, Smith, Mosier, Mewes, O'Halloran, and Anderson all said that it was terrible, and O'Halloran and Anderson further stating they were both glad they weren't involved.

Clerks: The Animated Series 

Touchstone Television (with Miramax Films) also produced Clerks: The Animated Series a short-lived six-episode animated television series featuring the same characters and cast of the original film. Two episodes aired on ABC in late May/early June 2000 before being pulled from the lineup. The full six episodes were released on DVD in 2001 before being run on Comedy Central in 2004 and Adult Swim from 2008 to 2010. In a trailer for (but not in) Jay and Silent Bob Strike Back, Randal, referencing the series, says to Dante: "If you were funnier than that, ABC would've never cancelled us."

Clerks: The Comics 

Clerks. is a series of comics written by Smith featuring characters from the film. In the series are Clerks: The Comic Book, Clerks: Holiday Special, and Clerks: The Lost Scene. Smith has discussed plans for Clerks 1.5, a comic that would bridge the gap between the original film and its sequel, to be included in a reprint of the Clerks. trade paperback. The story ultimately was printed in the 2006 Tales from the Clerks collection, which also included the other Clerks comics with additional View Askewniverse material. Smith received the Harvey Award for Best New Talent in 1999.

Shooting Clerks 

Shooting Clerks is a 2021 biographical comedy-drama film about the making of Clerks. The film stars many of the original film's stars, including O'Halloran, Ghigliotti, Mewes, and Smith himself. The film had a special fine cut screening at San Diego Comic-Con on July 20, 2019, in celebration of the 25th anniversary of the original film's release.

References 

 Bibliography
 Muir, John Kenneth (2002). An Askew View : The Films of Kevin Smith. Applause Books. 
 Smith, Kevin (1997). Clerks and Chasing Amy : Two Screenplays. Miramax Books.

External links 

 
 
 
 

1994 films
1994 comedy films
1994 directorial debut films
1990s black comedy films
1990s buddy comedy films
American black-and-white films
American black comedy films
American buddy comedy films
Films about criticism and refusal of work
Obscenity controversies in film
Rating controversies in film
Films about friendship
Films adapted into comics
Films adapted into television shows
Films directed by Kevin Smith
Films produced by Scott Mosier
Films set in 1993
Films set in New Jersey
Films with screenplays by Kevin Smith
Miramax films
Necrophilia in film
Sundance Film Festival award winners
United States National Film Registry films
View Askewniverse films
View Askew Productions films
Workplace comedy films
Films shot in 16 mm film
Fictional clerks
New Jersey culture
1990s English-language films
1990s American films
American independent films
1994 independent films